Arteshbod Gholam Reza Azhari (18 February 1912 – 5 November 2001) was a military leader and Prime Minister of Iran.

Early life and education

Azhari was born in Shiraz in 1912 (or in 1917). He was a graduate of Iran's war college. He was also trained at the National War College in Washington in the 1950s.

Career
Azhari worked at the CENTO. He was appointed chief of staff of Iran's armed forces in 1971 and his tenure lasted until 1978. He served as interim prime minister of a military government until a civilian government could be chosen. He served as prime minister from 6 November 1978 to 31 December 1978. He formed the first military government in Iran since 1953. 

On 21 December 1978, Azhari, then the prime minister, told U.S. Ambassador to Iran William Sullivan that, "You must know this and you must tell it to your government. This country is lost because the Shah cannot make up his mind." Azhari had a heart attack in January 1979 and resigned on 2 January. Then he was succeeded by Abbas Gharabaghi as the chief of the army staff. Shapour Bakhtiar succeeded Azhari as prime minister. On 18 February 1979 Azhari was retired from the army in absentia.

Cabinet

His cabinet was composed of nine members: 

 General Gholam Ali Oveissi, Military governor of Tehran (Labour and social affairs (acting)),
 Lieutenant General Nasser Moghaddam, head of the Security Police (Energy),
 General Abbas Gharabaghi (Interior),
 Lieutenant General Abdol Hassan Sa'adatmand (Housing and development),
 General Gholam-Reza Azhari (War) 
 General Reza Azimi (Defense) 
 Amir Khosrow Afshar (Foreign affairs), 
 Mohammad Reza Amin (Mines and industry), 
 Karim Motamedi (Posts and telecommunications)

However, it is also reported that the government was of eleven men and six of them were military officers.

Honours
 U.S. Legion of Merit

Rank

Later years and death
Azhari suffered a heart attack while serving as prime minister. After leaving office he went to the US in January 1979 for heart surgery at Bethesda Naval Hospital. After surgery he did not return to Iran and settled in McLean, Virginia. In the immediate aftermath of the revolution, Ayatollah Sadegh Khalkhali, a religious judge and then chairman of the Revolutionary Court, informed the press that the death sentence was passed on the members of the Pahlavi family and former Shah officials, including Azhari.

He died of cancer in McLean, Virginia, USA, on 5 November 2001.

See also
List of prime ministers of Iran

References

Sources
 'Alí Rizā Awsatí, Iran in the Past Three Centuries (Irān dar Se Qarn-e Goz̲ashteh - ), Volumes 1 and 2 (Paktāb Publishing - , Tehran, Iran, 2003).  (Vol. 1),  (Vol. 2).

1910s births
2001 deaths
Prime Ministers of Iran
People from Shiraz
Recipients of the Legion of Merit
Iranian emigrants to the United States
People of the Iranian Revolution
Deaths from cancer in Virginia
Exiles of the Iranian Revolution in the United States
Imperial Iranian Armed Forces four-star generals
20th-century Iranian politicians
21st-century Iranian people